Olga Dahl (née Ström; 20 September 1917 – 3 October 2009) was a Swedish genealogist.

Family 
Olga was born to Ernst and Mimmi (née Norlander) in Malmö. She married Sven Dahl, who was a professor of geography at Gothenburg School of Business, Economics and Law before his death in 1979. Together they had four children: Östen, born in 1945; Gudrun, born in 1948; Ingolf, born in 1950; and Åslög, born in 1955.

Career 
Olga Dahl received her bachelor's degree in geography, law and economics from Lund University. In the early 1950s she worked as a freelance consumer issue journalist for the women's magazine Husmodern. After having moved to Gothenburg she began studying family history, and published a series of articles. In the late 1970s she wrote about the 1600s and 1700s in a book about Gothenburg, Göteborgs hjärta – en bok om människor, affärer och byggnader kring Kungsgatan (The Heart of Gothenburg - a book about people, things, and buildings around Kungsgatan), with several others, including Per Clemensson, who wrote about the period 1775–1875, and Sven Gulin, who stands as the editor.

On her 90th birthday she witnessed her crowning achievement with the public opening of a database, "Göteborgs tomtägare 1637-1807", which details around 900 properties in central Gothenburg and their owners over the two century period.

Olga was a member of the Gothenburg Regional genealogical society from the 1950s onward, and was a local writer for the Swedish Biographical Dictionary. She taught several hundred amateur researchers the basic skills of genealogy and also gave courses in local history. She died in Gothenburg.

References 

1917 births
2009 deaths
People from Malmö
Swedish genealogists
Lund University alumni